In mathematics, specifically algebraic geometry, an exceptional divisor for a regular map

More strictly, f has an associated exceptional locus which describes how it identifies nearby points in codimension one, and the exceptional divisor is an appropriate algebraic construction whose support is the exceptional locus. The same ideas can be found in the theory of holomorphic mappings of complex manifolds.

More precisely, suppose that

Consideration of exceptional divisors is crucial in birational geometry: an elementary result (see for instance Shafarevich, II.4.4) shows (under suitable assumptions) that any birational regular map that is not an isomorphism has an exceptional divisor. A particularly important example is the blowup

of a subvariety

:

References

Algebraic geometry
Birational geometry